The 1991 Northern Iowa Panthers football team represented the University of Northern Iowa as a member of the Gateway Collegiate Athletic Conference (GCAC) during the 1991 NCAA Division I-AA football season. Led by third-year head coach Terry Allen, the Panther compiled an overall record of 11–2 with mark of 5–1 in conference play, winning the GCAC title. Northern Iowa advanced to the NCAA Division I-AA Football Championship playoffs, beating Weber State in the first round before losing to Marshall in the second round.

Schedule

References

Northern Iowa
Northern Iowa Panthers football seasons
Missouri Valley Football Conference champion seasons
Northern Iowa Panthers football